Corral Creek is a tributary of the Bow River in Alberta, Canada.

Corral Creek was named for the fact horses once were corralled there.

See also
List of rivers of Alberta

References

Rivers of Alberta